Umpqua National Forest, in southern Oregon's Cascade Range, covers an area of  in Douglas, Lane, and Jackson counties, and borders Crater Lake National Park.  The four ranger districts for the forest are the Cottage Grove, Diamond Lake, North Umpqua, and Tiller ranger districts.  The forest is managed by the United States Forest Service, headquartered in Roseburg.

Geography 
Stands of western hemlock, true fir, Douglas-fir and cedar transition to lower-elevation forests of mixed conifers and hardwoods. Timbered valleys of old-growth ponderosa and groves of oak separate mountains like the  Mount Thielsen and the  Mount Bailey.  Notable geologic features include volcanic basalt and andesite monolithic spires with descriptive names like Eagle Rock, Rattlesnake Rock, and Old Man.

History 
Ancestors of the Umpqua, Southern Molala, Yoncalla, and Cow Creek Band of Umpqua Tribe of Indians lived here before Mount Mazama erupted forming Crater Lake nearly 7,000 years ago.  The Indians were moved to reservations in 1856. As Europeans bought reservation lands, the tribes further fragmented to become farmers and ranchers in the Umpqua Valley.  Two translations of the word "umpqua" are "thundering waters" and "across the waters".

The Umpqua National Forest was created by the United States Congress on July 2, 1907.  The Forest Service staff soon began building trails, constructing bridges, fighting fires, monitoring grazing, and erecting lookouts.  Logging and mining began in 1925.  The Civilian Conservation Corps was active in the Umpqua National Forest by building roads, bridges and recreation facilities in the 1930s.

Points of interest 
The Umpqua National Forest is home to more than 250 wildlife species. Large mammals such as elk, deer, black bear, and cougar, as well as the smaller residents, squirrels, fox, raccoons, and bats are supported by the diverse forest habitats.  Raptors such as owls, eagles, osprey, and even peregrine falcons can occasionally be seen in the forest. Coho and Chinook salmon and steelhead, rainbow, brown and cutthroat trout swim, feed and spawn in the rivers and streams of the forest.

Recreational activities in the forest include camping, fishing, hiking, horseback riding, hunting, mountain biking, rock climbing, and boating.  Winter activities include both Nordic and downhill skiing, as well as snowshoeing and snowmobiling.

In 1988, the Oregon Omnibus Wild and Scenic Rivers Act designated a portion of the North Umpqua River as Wild and Scenic.  Twenty-six miles of the river run through the forest.

The Rogue-Umpqua National Scenic Byway extends  through the Rogue River–Siskiyou and Umpqua national forests, as well as the Medford and Roseburg districts of the Bureau of Land Management and private lands.

Wilderness areas 

The Umpqua National Forest contains three wilderness areas: Boulder Creek, Rogue-Umpqua Divide, and Mount Thielsen.

Boulder Creek 
One popular area in Boulder Creek is Pine Bench. A flat area overlooking Boulder Creek, Pine Bench is home to a grove of majestic old growth ponderosa pines. In 1996 the Spring Fire burned  in the Boulder Creek Wilderness.

Rogue-Umpqua Divide 
The Rogue-Umpqua Divide is a  wilderness area,  of which is inside the National Forest. (About 17% of it lies within Rogue River–Siskiyou National Forest.) The wilderness includes sub-alpine meadows and old-growth forests.

Mount Thielsen 
Mount Thielsen is a  wilderness area,  of which is located inside the National Forest. (The rest lies in either Winema National Forest or Deschutes National Forest.) The  Mt. Thielsen was born of the same volcanic activity that created Crater Lake and some trails pass over deep pumice that was deposited when Mt. Mazama erupted. The Pacific Crest Trail passes through the middle of the wilderness area.

See also
High Cascades Complex Fires

References

External links 

 Forest Service page on Umpqua National Forest
 Landscape Photos Showing Umpqua National Forest
 Umpqua National Forest Wilderness Areas

 
Protected areas of Douglas County, Oregon
Protected areas of Jackson County, Oregon
Protected areas of Lane County, Oregon
National Forests of Oregon
1907 establishments in Oregon
Protected areas established in 1907